Opinion polling was commissioned throughout the duration of the 46th New Zealand Parliament in the lead up to the 2002 election by various organisations.

Party vote
Polls are listed in the table below in chronological order. Refusals are generally excluded from the party vote percentages, while question wording and the treatment of "don't know" responses and those not intending to vote may vary between survey firms.

Graphical summary

Individual polls

Preferred Prime Minister

Individual polls

Electorate polling

Wellington Central

Candidate vote

Wigram

Candidate vote

Waitakere

Candidate vote

Coromandel

Candidate vote

Te Tai Tokerau

Candidate vote

See also
Opinion polling for the 2005 New Zealand general election
Politics of New Zealand

Notes

References

2002
2002 New Zealand general election
New Zealand